Belone euxini is a species of needlefish which is endemic to the Black Sea, Sea of Azov and Sea of Marmara. Many authorities treat this taxon as a subspecies of Belone belone.

References

euxeini
Fish described in 1866
Taxa named by Albert Günther